Zearlee Maxwell (August 16, 1902 – April 18, 1957), nicknamed "Jiggs", was an American Negro league third baseman in the 1930s.

A native of Cleburne, Texas, Maxwell made his Negro leagues debut in 1937 with the Memphis Red Sox, and played with Memphis again the following season. He died in his hometown of Cleburne in 1957 at age 54.

References

External links
 and Seamheads

1902 births
1957 deaths
Memphis Red Sox players
Baseball third basemen
Baseball players from Texas
People from Cleburne, Texas
20th-century African-American sportspeople